N99 or N-99 may refer to:
 Brandywine Airport, in West Goshen Township, Pennsylvania, United States; formerly assigned FAA LID N99
 , a submarine of the Royal Navy
 N99 motorway (Netherlands)
 Nebraska Highway 99, in the United States
 NIOSH N99, a rating for respirators and surgical masks
 NR-N99 tank droid, a fictional vehicle in the Star Wars universe